The 2021 Phoenix Rising FC season is the club's eighth season in the USL Championship and their fifth as Rising FC. They are the defending USL Championship Western Conference champions.

Competitions

Friendlies
All times from this point on Mountain Standard Time (UTC-07:00)

USL Championship

Results by round

Matches

Group table

USL Championship Playoffs

Conference Playoffs

Roster

Player transactions

Loan in

Loan out

Transfer In

Transfer Out

Statistics
(regular-season & Playoffs)

One Own Goal each scored by LA Galaxy II and Sacramento Republic FC

Goalkeepers

See also 
 2021 in American soccer
 2021 USL Championship season
 Phoenix Rising FC

References 

2021
Phoenix Rising FC
Phoenix Rising FC
Phoenix Rising FC
Phoenix Rising FC